Balkema is a surname. Notable people with the surname include:

August Aimé Balkema (1906–1996), Dutch book trader and publisher
Nicholas Balkema (1865–1954), American politician
Simon Balkema (1896–1971), Dutch wrestler

Dutch-language surnames